was a Japanese Nippon Professional Baseball pitcher. He played for the Taiyō Whales from 1960 to 1973. Kondo was named the Japan Series Most Valuable Player in 1960. He later managed the Yokohama BayStars from 1993 to 1995 and the Chiba Lotte Marines in 1997 and 1998. He died on 27 March 2019, five days before his 81st birthday.

References

External links
Career statistics and player information from Baseball-Reference

1938 births
2019 deaths
Baseball people from Kagawa Prefecture
Waseda University alumni
Japanese baseball players
Taiyō Whales players
Managers of baseball teams in Japan
Yokohama DeNA BayStars managers
Chiba Lotte Marines managers
People from Takamatsu, Kagawa